Torrens Connect is a public transport operator in Adelaide, Australia that commenced operating bus and tram services as part of the Adelaide Metro network under contract to the Department of Planning, Transport & Infrastructure in July 2020. It is owned by a consortium of Torrens Transit, John Holland and UGL Rail.

, Torrens Connect has a fleet of 24 tram sets and over 200 buses.

History
In July 2019, the Government of South Australia announced its intention to privatise the Adelaide Metro tram services operated by the Department of Planning, Transport & Infrastructure. In March 2020, the Torrens Connect consortium of Torrens Transit, John Holland and UGL Rail were awarded the North-South contract. The contract commenced on 5 July 2020 and will run for eight years with a two-year optional extension. As well as tram services, the contract includes bus services, Torrens Transit already operated as an established Adelaide Metro contractor.

References

External links
Torrens Connect

Bus companies of South Australia
Companies based in Adelaide
Tram transport in South Australia
Transport companies established in 2020
Transport in Adelaide
Australian companies established in 2020